OPC may refer to:

Architecture and engineering
 Optical proximity correction
 Ordinary Portland cement
 Organic Photo Conductor, an element used for, among other applications, photocopier and laser printer drums.

Computing
 Open Packaging Conventions, a container-file technology created by Microsoft to store a combination of XML and non-XML files
 Open Platform Communications (formerly "OLE for Process Control")
 OPC Foundation, a related consortium 
 Operations Planning and Control, from Tivoli Software, known as IBM Tivoli Workload Scheduler
 Optimized Power Control, a method to adjust laser power when writing optical media.
 Other peoples' computers, reference to privacy issues of cloud computing data being on somebody else's computer rather than your own and potential security issues.

Medicine and natural sciences
 Ocean Prediction Center
 Oligodendrocyte precursor cell
 Oligomeric proanthocyanidin
 Oropharyngeal cancer

Social matters, politics and government
Obama Presidential Center
 (Federal) Office for the Protection of the Constitution, a translation of the German name Bundesamt für Verfassungsschutz
 Office of Policy Coordination, a secret U.S. government unit, 1948–1952
 Office of the Parliamentary Counsel (United Kingdom)
 Office of the Privacy Commissioner of Canada
 Online Party of Canada
 Ontario Progressive Conservative Party, Conservative political party in the province of Ontario
 Oodua Peoples Congress, militant Yoruba nationalist organization situated in Nigeria
 Organisation pour la prévention de la cécité (Organisation for the Prevention of Blindness), a French blindness charity working in Africa
 Orthodox Presbyterian Church, a confessional Reformed Christian denomination
 Overseas Press Club

Other
 O-Pee-Chee, a Canadian sports card company
 Ontario Pioneer Camp, in Huntsville, Ontario, Canada
 Ontario Police College
 Opel Performance Center, a division of car manufacturer Opel
 Optional Payment Charge, a surcharge applied when paying by credit card for airline flights